Ekaterina Anatolievna Kuzmina (born January 5, 1996) is a Russian curler from Moscow.

Awards and honours
 Master of Sports of Russia (curling, 2015).
 Master of Sports of Russia, International Class (curling, 2016).

Teams and events

Women's

Mixed

Mixed doubles

References

External links

Curling World Cup profile

Living people
1996 births
Curlers from Moscow
Russian female curlers
Russian curling champions
Competitors at the 2019 Winter Universiade
Universiade bronze medalists for Russia
Universiade medalists in curling
Curlers at the 2022 Winter Olympics
Olympic curlers of Russia